The Jan Heemskerk cabinet was the cabinet of the Netherlands from 23 April 1883 until 21 April 1888. The cabinet was formed by Independent Conservatives (Ind. Con.), Independent Liberals (Ind. Lib.) and Independent Catholics (Ind. Cat.) after the election of 1883. The right-wing cabinet was a majority government in the House of Representatives. Independent Liberal Conservative Jan Heemskerk was Prime Minister.

Cabinet Members

 Resigned.
 Served ad interim.

References

External links
Official

  Kabinet-Heemskerk Azn. Parlement & Politiek

Cabinets of the Netherlands
1883 establishments in the Netherlands
1888 disestablishments in the Netherlands
Cabinets established in 1883
Cabinets disestablished in 1888